Embroidered peppers ( or ), also known as engraved peppers, is a traditional Macedonian meze made of fresh, dried or condimented peppers of the Capsicum annuum species threaded on a string.

Background
Peppers are a staple ingredient of Macedonian cuisine. Capsicum annuum of the Capsicum species exist in several different landraces in North Macedonia and in neighbouring Kosovo, Albania and Serbia. Embroidered Macedonian peppers have a specific fruit appearance, taste and use and there are several different landraces. There are approximately 789 pepper samples, 204 of which are embroidered peppers.

Method of preparation
Fruits of peppers are threaded together on strings and left on balconies or in attics to be dried. They are also found in urban areas of the country or are sold in local green markets. Bukovec, or Bukov piper, is a spice made from roughly crushed red peppers.

See also
 Balkan cuisine
 Eastern European cuisine

References

Further reading

Macedonian cuisine
Balkan cuisine